Automeris naranja is a species of moth of the family Saturniidae. It is found in Bolivia, Brazil, Paraguay, Uruguay and Argentina. This species is easy to raise in captivity.

The larvae feed on Morus alba, Morus nigra and Fraxinus americana.

References

External links
 Species info

Hemileucinae
Moths described in 1898
Moths of South America